Falmouth is a town in Cumberland County, Maine, United States. The population was 12,444 at the 2020 census. It is part of the Portland–South Portland–Biddeford, Maine metropolitan statistical area.

This northern suburb of Portland borders Casco Bay and offers one of the largest anchorages in Maine. The town is home to three private golf clubs and the Portland Yacht Club.

History

Native Americans 

Native Americans followed receding glaciers into Maine around 11,000 BCE. At the time of European contact in the sixteenth century, people speaking a western dialect of the Wabanaki language inhabited present-day Falmouth. Captain John Smith observed a semi-autonomous band  known as the Aucocisco living in Casco Bay. English explorer Christopher Levett met with the Aucocisco Sagamore Skittery Gusset at his summer village at the Presumpscot Falls in 1623.

A combination of warfare and disease decimated Native peoples in the years before English colonization, creating a shatter zone of devastation and political instability in what would become southern Maine. The introduction of European wares in the 1500s reoriented long-standing Native trade relationships in the Gulf of Maine. Warfare soon broke out among groups such as the Mi'kmaq and Penobscot who sought to subjugate their neighbors by monopolizing access to European goods. The arrival of foreign pathogens only served to compound the upheaval in the region. A particularly notorious epidemic between 1614 and 1620 ravaged the population of coastal New England with mortality rates at upwards of 90 percent. Native peoples were not totally destroyed however, maintaining a visible presence in the Casco Bay area until King George's War in the 1740s. French military defeat and increasing English settler migration to the area from primarily southern New England impelled most Native Americans to assimilate into European society, migrate toward the protection of New France or further up the coast where they remain today.

New Casco (1630–1765) 

Falmouth's original bounds encompassed the present day cities of Portland, South Portland, Westbrook and Cape Elizabeth. Today’s town was known as New Casco, and was only a neighborhood within the larger collection of communities around Casco Bay centered in what is downtown Portland. Falmouth’s early years were marked by extreme violence as it lay on a borderland zone between Europeans and Native Americans. Casco Bay represented the northernmost point of English settlement on the east coast until 1713. Numerous wars between 1675–1763 among the English, French, and Native Americans rarely left Falmouth unscathed from the violence. The English twice abandoned Casco Bay altogether under pressure from French and Indian attacks in 1676 and 1690.

The first European resident was Arthur Mackworth, who lived on the east bank of the Presumpscot River as early as 1630. When the Massachusetts Bay Colony took political control of Maine in 1658 from the heirs of Sir Ferdinando Gorges, they renamed the area Falmouth after an important Parliamentary victory in the English Civil War. Colloquially known as "Falmouth in Casco Bay" to distinguish it from Falmouth, Massachusetts on Cape Cod, it was the 7th town in the recently formed Province of Maine, later being formally incorporated on November 12, 1718.

One of the earliest structures in the town of Falmouth was a palisaded fort and trading post named Fort Casco built in 1698 at the conclusion of King William's War. The location of the fort can be found today opposite Pine Grove Cemetery on Route 88. Massachusetts built the fort at the behest of local Abenaki desiring a convenient place to trade and repair tools and weapons. A 1701 meeting between the Wabanaki leaders and Massachusetts officials cemented an alliance between the two. A pair of stone cairns were then erected to symbolize the new partnership. The nearby Two Brothers Islands later received their name from this now long-forgotten monument.

Unfortunately this peace would last less than three years, with the inauguration of Queen Anne's War in 1702. Governor Joseph Dudley held a conference at New Casco with representatives of the Abenaki tribes on June 20, 1703, trying to convince them not to ally with the French. His efforts were unsuccessful, as the fort was besieged only two months later by Abenaki Sagamores Moxus, Wanungonet, Assacombuit and their French Allies during the Northeast Coast Campaign.  The arrival of the Massachusetts ship Province Galley relieved the fort by dispersing the Wabanaki and the some 500 French with its guns. Peace returned in 1713 with the Treaty of Portsmouth. When the resettlement of present-day Portland began in 1716, the Province of Massachusetts ordered that the fort at New Casco be demolished rather than maintain it.

New Casco could not be safely settled by the English until the fall of Quebec in 1759 permanently removed the threat of French and Indian attack. Living so far away from Portland was dangerous: only one family lived in the town in 1725. An Indian raid in 1745 and the murder of Job Burnal in 1751 represented the risks colonists undertook to live in the area.  The majority of the first permanent European inhabitants to the town came after 1740, quickly growing to "62 families" and forming their own parish in 1753 (currently the Falmouth Congregational Church). The population of Falmouth would hover between 1,000 and 2,000 residents for the next two centuries.  These residents engaged in farming, fishing, and harvesting masts. Mills on the Presumpscot River, Piscataqua River in West Falmouth, and Mussel Cove powered sawmills, processed agricultural products, and manufactured finished goods by the 1800s.

Modern Falmouth 

In 1765 Cape Elizabeth (then including South Portland) seceded from Falmouth. In 1786, Portland broke away, followed in 1814 by Westbrook, although boundaries between it and Falmouth were readjusted throughout the nineteenth century. Logistics were the reason these separations. Population had grown by the 1760s to the extent that separate church parishes had formed, creating rival communities more attuned to local concerns.  People also complained about the distance between outer areas and the center of the town in present-day Portland.  By 1859, fishing and farming were principal trades. Other industries included three shipbuilders, three brickmakers, a sawmill, gristmill and tannery. In 1886, the town also produced boots, shoes, tinware and carriage stock.

The extension of trolley service from Portland to the Falmouth Foreside in 1898 initiated the town's transformation from a rural community to an urban consumer society. Trolleys cemented Falmouth’s economic connection to Portland and transformed the Foreside neighborhood into a relaxation spot for nearby city dwellers. Portland’s Yankee elites relocated the Portland Yacht Club and Portland Country Club to Falmouth in 1885 and 1913 respectively, where they have remained ever since. To promote its line, the Portland and Yarmouth Electric Railway Company opened Underwood Spring Park north of Town Landing in 1899. The park’s attractions included a casino, hotel, and outdoor theater. Fire destroyed Underwood Spring Park in 1907 and was not rebuilt. The Portland–Lewiston Interurban also ran up today’s Route 100 in West Falmouth. People’s growing preference for the automobile spelled the end for trolleys, which ended service in 1933.

In 1943, Percival Proctor Baxter donated Mackworth Island to the state as a wildlife refuge; today it is site of the state school for the deaf and hard of hearing.

The advent of the automobile accelerated Falmouth's transition toward becoming a residential suburb of Portland. Military personnel who moved to the town while Casco Bay was base Sail for America’s destroyer fleet from 1941 to 1944 bolstered much of this growth. Like many urban areas in the United States during the mid-twentieth century, the automobile, cheaper residential taxes, and the desire for open space channeled an urban exodus away from cities like Portland into neighboring towns such as Falmouth. In the span of fifty years the town’s population has skyrocketed from five thousand to over ten thousand residents today. Falmouth’s location on the ocean, along with its respected public school system, has made it one of the more attractive communities in Greater Portland. This demand consequently led developers to construct two additional country clubs in 1986 and 1988. The nature of such enclosed neighborhoods and other high-scale subdivisions like it has only recently turned the town into one of the most affluent in Maine.

Geography
Located beside Casco Bay, the Gulf of Maine and Atlantic Ocean, Falmouth is drained by the Presumpscot River.

The town is crossed by Interstate 95 and 295, U. S. Route 1 and state routes 9, 26, 88 and 100. It borders the towns of Cumberland to the northeast, Westbrook and Portland to the southwest, and Windham to the northwest. There are two census-designated places occupying the eastern portion of the town: Falmouth CDP to the south, and Falmouth Foreside to the north.

Demographics

As of 2000 the median income for a household in the town was $66,855, and the median income for a family was $87,304. Males had a median income of $54,545 versus $35,258 for females. The per capita income for the town was $36,716.  About 1.8% of families and 3.7% of the population were below the poverty line, including 3.2% of those under age 18 and 4.7% of those age 65 or over.

2010 census
As of the census of 2010, there were 11,185 people, 4,334 households, and 3,063 families residing in the town. The racial makeup of the town was 95.4% White, 0.5% African American, 0.2% Native American, 2.3% Asian, 0.4% from other races, and 1.2% from two or more races. Hispanic or Latino of any race were 1.3% of the population.

There were 4,334 households, of which 36.5% had children under the age of 18 living with them, 60.9% were married couples living together, 6.7% had a female householder with no husband present, 3.1% had a male householder with no wife present, and 29.3% were non-families. 24.0% of all households were made up of individuals, and 12.8% had someone living alone who was 65 years of age or older. The average household size was 2.54 and the average family size was 3.05.

The median age in the town was 45.3 years. 25.9% of residents were under the age of 18; 4.3% were between the ages of 18 and 24; 19.2% were from 25 to 44; 33.6% were from 45 to 64; and 16.8% were 65 years of age or older. The gender makeup of the town was 47.9% male and 52.1% female.

Sites of interest
 Falmouth Historical Society & Museum
 Falmouth Memorial Library
 Falmouth Nature Preserve
 Gilsland Farm Audubon Center
 Mackworth Island Public Reserved Land
 Maine State Ballet Theatre
 Governor Baxter School for the Deaf
 Falmouth High School (Maine)

Education

Until June 2011, the town had a K–12 school system that included four individual school buildings. Lunt School included grades K–2 followed by Plummer-Motz which contained grades 3–4. Falmouth Middle School incorporated grades 5–8 and Falmouth High School contained grades 9–12. A new building, Falmouth Elementary School, opened in the fall of 2011. It was dedicated on September 17, 2011. The new elementary school contains grades K–5, replacing both Lunt School and Plummer-Motz.  Falmouth Middle School now contains grades 6–8. The School Department is under the jurisdiction of the Falmouth School Board with participation of the Leadership Council and Superintendent of the Schools.

The Falmouth School Department is considered well above average by Maine state standards. Falmouth was named the "Top City to Live and Learn" by Forbes in 2011.

Amenities
The privately owned, unattended Eric's Field airstrip is located between Winn Road and Longwoods Road, just south of Falmouth Country Club. Its FAA identifier is 78ME, and it was activated in 2009. Its runway (unpaved) headings are 18 and 36. Its area control center is Boston Center, while its flight service station is Bangor.

Notable people 

 Mary Cunningham Agee, business executive
 William Cranch Bond, astronomer
 Cathy Breen, Maine state legislator
 Joseph Cummings, president of Wesleyan University (1857–1875), president of Northwestern University (1881–1890)
 Gerald Davis, state legislator
 Rob Derhak, musician
 Frank Fixaris, sportscaster 
 G. Hannelius, actress
 Roger Levesque, retired soccer player for the Seattle Sounders FC
 Mercy Lewis, accuser during the Salem witch trials
 Helen Longley, former First Lady of Maine
 Bob Marley, comedian
 John R. McKernan Jr., US congressman, 71st governor of Maine
 John Menario, Portland city manager and candidate for Governor of Maine
 Gary Merrill, actor
 Stanley C. Norton, U.S. Navy Rear Admiral and Navy Cross recipient 
 Joan Whitney Payson, philanthropist, noted art collector
 David D. Pearce, US ambassador to Algeria
 Richard Rockefeller, physician, great-grandson of John D. Rockefeller Jr.
 Olympia Snowe, US senator
 Scott Wilson, appellate judge

Popular culture
Falmouth has been featured in several short stories and novels by author Stephen King, including "One for the Road", "Jerusalem's Lot", and most notably in 'Salem's Lot.

References

External links

  Official Town of Falmouth website
 Falmouth Memorial Library
 Falmouth School Department
 Maine.gov – Falmouth, Maine
 Modern rendering of 1753 Falmouth map from the Maine Memory Network
 Maine Genealogy: Falmouth, Cumberland County, Maine
 Block and Garrison Houses at Ancient Falmouth

 
Towns in Cumberland County, Maine
Casco Bay
Populated coastal places in Maine
Portland metropolitan area, Maine
Populated places established in 1632
1632 establishments in the Thirteen Colonies
Towns in Maine